Holy Cross in Chicago may refer to:

 Holy Cross Church in Chicago
 Holy Cross Hospital (Chicago)